The Kingdom of Montenegro was a monarchy in southeastern Europe, present-day Montenegro, during the tumultuous period of time on the Balkan Peninsula leading up to and during World War I. Officially it was a constitutional monarchy, but absolutist in practice. On 28 November 1918, following the end of World War I, with the Montenegrin government still in exile, the Podgorica Assembly proclaimed unification with the Kingdom of Serbia, which itself was merged into the Kingdom of Serbs, Croats and Slovenes three days later, on 1 December 1918. This unification with Serbia lasted, through various successor states, for almost 88 years, ending in 2006.

History

Prince Nicholas of Montenegro proclaimed the Kingdom of Montenegro in Cetinje on 28 August 1910, elevating the country from the rank of Principality. King Nicholas I had ruled the country as Prince since 1860, and had initiated several modernising reforms at the beginning of the 20th century, such as introducing a constitution and a new currency, the Montenegrin perper.

Montenegro joined the First Balkan War in 1912, hoping to win a share in the last Ottoman-controlled areas of Rumelia. Montenegro did make further territorial gains by splitting Sandžak with Serbia on 30 May 1913. But the Montenegrins had to abandon the newly captured city of İşkodra (Skadar in Serbian, modern-day Shkodër) to the new state of Albania in May 1913, at the insistence of the Great Powers. Esad Pasha made a deal to surrender the town to the Montenegrins in exchange for Montenegro supporting his claims in Central Albania. However, as Shkodër and the surroundings had a large ethnic Albanian majority, the area went to the state of Albania instead.
When the Second Balkan War broke out in June 1913, Serbia fought against Bulgaria, and King Nicholas sided with Serbia.

During World War I (1914–1918) Montenegro allied itself with the Triple Entente, in line with King Nicholas' pro-Serbian policy. Accordingly, Austria-Hungary occupied Montenegro from 15 January 1916 to October 1918.

On 20 July 1917, the signing of the Corfu Declaration foreshadowed the unification of Montenegro with Serbia. On 26 November 1918, the Podgorica Assembly, an elected body claiming to represent Montenegrin people, unanimously adopted a resolution deposing king Nicholas I (who was still in exile) and unifying Montenegro with Serbia. Upon this event Nicholas I, who had previously supported unification with Serbia into a greater state with his dynasty playing the pivotal role, switched to promoting Montenegrin nationalism and opposing the union with Serbia, a position he maintained until his death in France in 1921.

On 1 December 1918, Serbia and Montenegro together formed a major part of the new Kingdom of Serbs, Croats and Slovenes (Yugoslavia).

During World War II, the occupying forces in Yugoslavia considered turning the Italian governorate of Montenegro into a puppet kingdom, but nothing came of these plans.

Rulers

King of Montenegro (1910–1918)

Nicholas I of Montenegro (1910–1918)

Prime Ministers (1910–1916)

Lazar Tomanović (1910–1912)
Mitar Martinović (1912–1913)
Janko Vukotić (1913–1915)
Milo Matanović (1915–1916)
Lazar Mijušković (1916)

Prime Ministers in-exile (1916–1922)
Lazar Mijušković (1916)
Andrija Radović (1916–1917)
Milo Matanović (1917)
Evgenije Popović (1917–1919)
Jovan Plamenac (1919–1921)
Anto Gvozdenović (1921–1922)
Milutin Vučinić (1922)
Anto Gvozdenović (1922)

Gallery

See also
History of Montenegro
Principality of Montenegro

References

Further reading

External links

 Kingdom of Montenegro in 1918 
 Montenegro – World Statesmen

 

Montenegro, Kingdom of
Montenegro
Montenegro
Montenegro
1910s establishments in Montenegro
1916 disestablishments in Europe
1918 disestablishments in Europe
1922 disestablishments in Europe
States and territories established in 1910
States and territories disestablished in 1918
1910 establishments in Europe
Montenegro